Li Qian (born 13 February 1989) is a Chinese para table tennis player who has won four gold medals and one silver medal from three Paralympic Games (2008, 2012, and 2016). She has won international team titles with Liu Jing.

Like many of her teammates, Li was a polio victim from Pizhou who attended New Hope Center as a child. That's where coach Heng Xin developed her into a star.

References

Chinese female table tennis players
Paralympic table tennis players of China
Medalists at the 2008 Summer Paralympics
Medalists at the 2012 Summer Paralympics
Medalists at the 2016 Summer Paralympics
Table tennis players at the 2008 Summer Paralympics
Table tennis players at the 2012 Summer Paralympics
Table tennis players at the 2016 Summer Paralympics
Paralympic gold medalists for China
Paralympic silver medalists for China
Paralympic medalists in table tennis
Living people
1989 births
Para table tennis players from Pizhou
People with polio
Table tennis players at the 2020 Summer Paralympics
FESPIC Games competitors